Båtstø is a small village in Asker, Norway.

Båtstø is located in  Asker municipality in Viken county. The village is situated along the Oslofjord between Åros and Nærsnes. The distance to Drammen is about 24 km  and to Oslo about 38 km.
The population of Båtstø was 228 as of January 2005.

References

Villages in Viken (county)
Villages in Buskerud
Villages in Asker
Villages in Røyken
Røyken